The Bayer designation Kappa Sculptoris (κ Scl, κ Sculptoris) is shared by two star systems, κ¹ Sculptoris and κ² Sculptoris, in the constellation Sculptor.  They are separated by 0.53° in the sky.

 κ1 Sculptoris (HR 24), binary containing two F-type giants
 κ2 Sculptoris (HR 34), K-type giant

Sculptoris, Kappa
Sculptor (constellation)